The Padang Terap District is a district in Kedah, Malaysia. It is governed by the Padang Terap District Council.

Etymology
Padang Terap is named after the Terap tree (Artocarpus elasticus) which is a type of drought-tolerant plant.

Administrative divisions

Padang Terap District is divided into 11 mukims, which are:
 Batang Tunggang Kanan
 Batang Tunggang Kiri
 Belimbing Kanan
 Belimbing Kiri
 Kurong Hitam
 Padang Temak
 Padang Terap Kanan
 Padang Terap Kiri
 Pedu
 Tekai
 Tolak

Demographics

Federal Parliament and State Assembly Seats 

List of Padang Terap district representatives in the Federal Parliament (Dewan Rakyat) 

List of Padang Terap district representatives in the State Legislative Assembly (Dewan Undangan Negeri)

Tourist attractions
 Pedu Lake

See also
 Districts of Malaysia

References